Myrlande Constant (born 1968) is a Haitian textile artist who specializes in Vodou themed flags, or drapo Vodou. Since she began making Vodou flags in the 1990s, she has transformed and surpassed this medium, preferring to make large-scale tableau, she describes her work as "painting with beads."  Constant is married and the mother of four children.

Biography 
Constant was born in Port-au-Prince in Haiti where, as a teenager, she learned the art of beading while working with her mother in a Port-au-Prince factory making wedding dresses. Once she quit that job, she moved on to be one of the most celebrated artists for making Vodou drapo. Constant has taken part in the revolution in the art of drapo-making over the last two decades. She has been making flags since the 1900s. Since the 1900s, there was an abrupt shift in drapo-making, which was primarily a male art form. There are several new designers who are women now, one of them being Myrlande Constant. Because of the impact that Constant has on other people, she influences art-making in other individuals, in particular Marilyn Houlberg.

Constant bears witness to her nation's calamities. For example, after the earthquake in Haiti in 2010, the artwork Myrlande made represented the collectivistic society through the things that were going on at the time.

Her works are densely beaded flags (some as large as six by seven feet). Constant's flags are much larger than traditional flags. In 2011, Constant participated in a series of exhibitions, workshops, and lectures at Brown University in Providence, Rhode Island, where she conducted a three-day flag-making workshop.

Principal expositions and works 
Myrlande Constant had her first sale to Richard A Morse, who was the manager of the Oloffson Hotel in Port-au-Prince. Other subsequent sales of her outstanding Vodou flags were made through the connections of her husband, Charles, who convinced customers and visitors at the hotel to buy her work. Many of Constant's inspirations for her artwork came from her father, who is a Vodou priest and Christian. She states that she has no one to thank but the spirits and God before the spirits. She additionally states that the mystical feelings and aspirations come from her thoughts. Everything she puts on a flag is there for a reason because the spirit keeps her working. Constant is also inspired by Milo Rigaud's landmark book called Veve. This book contains symbolic drawings of spirits made on Vodou temple floors. Constant uses that inspiration to remember her memories of Vodou ceremonies and knowledge of the spirits to create her own design in the flags.

The main process of the making of her flags starts with pencil drawings on white cloth. Second, she sews the sequins and beads to the cloth. Lastly, she incorporates the colors that associate with the spirits. Typically, most of her works are as large as bedspreads depicting various significant events in Vodou and Haitian history through using needle, thread, cloth, and tiny adornments.

Constant is particularly a well-known Haitian and Vodou artist in many parts of the world. Specifically, her piece of the 2010 Haiti earthquake apocalypse was recognized as an immediate potential for becoming one of the 2011 Ghetto Biennale Exhibition in New York's most extreme and powerful artistic visions. In 2014, her work was exhibited along with André Eugène, Adler Guerrier, Pascale Monnin, and others in a group show co-curated by Herns Louis Marcelin and Kate Ramsey titled "Transformative Visions: Works by Haitian Artists from the Permanent Collection" that was held at the University of Miami Lowe Art Museum. In 2018, she was one of the participating artists in the group show, PÒTOPRENS: The Urban Artists of Port-au-Prince at Pioneer Works, co-curated by Haitian-American artist and curator Edouard Duval-Carrié and British artist and curator Leah Gordon. In 2019, along with twenty-two other artists, her work was exhibited in "The Last Supper" themed Faena Art Festival in Miami. Pushing the boundaries of the form, the largest of her flags measured  10 by 7 feet. In 2022, a retrospective of her work will be held at the Fowler Museum at UCLA. Constant's work Negra Danbala Wedo (1994-2019), is featured in the collection of the Pérez Art Museum Miami. 

Haiti madi 12 januye 2010 (Haiti Tuesday, January 12, 2010)

239 x 249 cm

Private collection

This piece of artwork is made with fabric, beads, and sequins. Myrlande Constant's tableau depicts the ruins and aftermath of the 2010 earthquake. It was commissioned by the Fowler Museum with funds provided by the Fay Bettye Green Fund to Commission New Work. This piece makes the viewer feel the need to study the miseries and disasters that happen in human life. The chaoticness of the imagery resembles how chaotic the actual event was in 2010. The visual characteristics include a border of crossbones and skulls, and angels and God looking down on the situation resembling the prophet Ezekiel's vision of dry bones: “The hand of the Lord was on me, and he brought me out by the Spirit of the Lord and set me in the middle of the valley, it was full of bones. Ezekiel 37:1).” Other aspects of this piece include homes, churches, and Vodou temples, all being reduced to rubble. Dogs and pigs gnaw on the unburied unprotected human remains. The Catholic Archbishop Serge Miot, who is a man of God, lies dead under the fallen roof of his cathedral with a hand on a bible. Other individuals in the piece are shown as Vodouists who either carry a child in their arms or wheelbarrow the dead and wounded to the appropriate destinations as a summoning mortal to the hand of their maker in the call of Gabriel. More individuals either pick up the ruins or sink to the ground as if remaining upright on solid earth is not an option. Constant's piece depicted a meaning that explained the suffering as ultimately, just as with life, letting death go on. Looking forward to Ash Wednesday being faithful and having anticipation on Eastertide's Resurrection were things that Constant reminded the victims of. The victims were shown, “Remember that thou art dust, and to dust thou shalt return.” And so, too, the Gede will rise up to their feet, shake off the dirt, adjust their glasses, straighten their hats, grab their canes and crutches, and dance.

La Sirene, 200231’’ x 51’’

Private collection

The La Sirene is made with beads, sequins, and faux pearls on satin. This flag depicts a coquettish spirit who glides through the sea holding flowers and a handheld mirror close by. There is a legend that states the spirit pulls women underwater to get the transformational gift of healing power.Simbi Andezo, 199636.5’’ x 34.5.’’

Private collection

The Simbi Andezo is made of beads and faux pearls on satin. The image dramatically depicts a male Iwa as a regal female in a white gown. There are flowers that fall from her hands. Simbi is seen as a healer who uses plants for the healing of medicine, which also represents the power of water.Carrefour

21.8’’ x 33.5.’’

Waterloo Center for the Arts

This flag is made with cloth, sequins, and beads. It is shown with mainly bright purple beads with three symbols going from top to bottom. The word “Carrefour” is seen in the lower-left corner made with blue beads. “Le8banedre3 leis” is seen in the lower right corner with blue beads. A bright green satin cloth border is around the outside.

Voodoo Ceremony Flag

27’’ x 60’’

Waterloo Center for the Arts

The Voodoo Ceremony Flag is made with cloth, sequins, and beads. This large flag depicts a voodoo ceremony with a large group of people. This includes a drum player, two nude females, baron, food, and libation. There is a cloth border in purple with small blue flowers and green leaves.

Al Dalaflmbo-Negrel’a L’arch en Clfi

18.75” x 31.75”

Waterloo Center for the Arts

This flag or banner is made with cloth, sequins, and beads. It depicts a blonde nude woman with green snakes wrapped around her body. The woman seems to be in front of a green drawn curtain with a black background behind it and voodoo symbols on each side.

Saint Patricke

31.6’’ x 24.75.”

Waterloo Center for the Arts

Saint Patricke is made of cloth, sequins, and beads. It is a St. Patrick Flag showing St Patrick in a green robe carrying a yellow staff and stepping on snakes. His hand is guiding the snakes towards the water.

Erzulie Freda

26’’ x 22.5’’

Waterloo Center for the Arts

This is a beaded flag that depicts Erzulie Freda based on an image on the Mater Dolorosa/Virgin of Sorrows chromolithograph. She is seen as robed in blue as she holds a staff and has various jewels around her. Many objects around her are in the shape of hearts. The entire flag is heavily beaded with a blue cloth border.

Ogou O Lishana-Gane Gre Jupi Tertannerre

18.5” x 27”

Waterloo Center for the Arts

The beaded flag is originated from Haiti and depicts a rooster in the center of a large oval covering the center of the flag. A cup and bottle are placed next to the rooster. The border on the outside is orange.

Omnipresen Ciadvivn

21’’ x 19’’

Waterloo Center for the Arts

This is a sequined and beaded flag showing a dramatic image of an old testament deity. The flag shows a fair-skinned, white-haired figure in the middle with his hands extended outwards. There is an eye at his torso with rays of color extending out from the eye in all directions. The scale on one side shows a scale with a devil and an angel. The cloth has a thin white border and a thick blue border around the outside.

Erzulie Freda

52” x 53”

Waterloo Center for the Arts

Erzulie Freda is a densely beaded flag with a blue satin border that depicts the individual, Erzulie Freda. The background is green. There is a large gold heart at the front and also to the lower right side of the figure.

Dambalah Wedo et Ayda Voir Preeace

51’’ x 56.5’’

Waterloo Center for the Arts

This is a sequined flag that originated from Haiti. The flag depicts Dambalah Wedo. Ayda along with other spirits are shown in the forest. It is a gold background with a mauve satin border.

References

External links 
 Indigo Arts Gallery
 Waterloo Center for the Arts

1968 births
Haitian artists
People from Port-au-Prince
Living people
Voodoo artists